James Middleton (25th April, 1922 – 4rth October, 1997) was a well-known Scottish professional footballer, who played as a wing half.

Career
He was born in Blackridge and joined Bradford City from Third Lanark in May, 1949. He made 8 league appearances for the club. He was released by the club in 1950, and later played for East Stirlingshire. He also made 38 Mossley appearances scoring 7 goals over the course of three seasons in the early 1950s.

Sources

References

1922 births
1997 deaths
Scottish footballers
Third Lanark A.C. players
Bradford City A.F.C. players
East Stirlingshire F.C. players
Scottish Football League players
English Football League players
Association football wing halves
Mossley A.F.C. players